The Little Broken Hearts Tour was the fifth world tour by American singer-songwriter Norah Jones.

Support Acts
Sarah Jaffe
Jim Campilongo Electric Trio
The Candles
Cory Chisel and The Wandering Sons
Richard Julian
Jesse Harris (South America)

Setlist
"Good Morning"
"Take It Back"
"Say Goodbye"
"Little Broken Hearts"
"She's 22"
"Even Though"
"Chasing Pirates"
"All a Dream"
"It Must Have Been the Roses (Grateful Dead)"
"Black"
"Miriam"
"Man of the Hour"
"Don’t Know Why"
"Sinkin’ Soon"
"Happy Pills"
"Stuck"
"Come Away with Me"

Encore
"Creepin' In"
"How Many Times Have You Broken My Heart"
Source:

Tour dates

Cancellations and rescheduled shows

Box Office score data

Band
Norah Jones – Piano
Josh Lattanzi – Bass
Jason Abraham Roberts – Guitar
Greg 'G Wiz' Wieczorek – Drums

Source:

References

2012 concert tours
2013 concert tours
Norah Jones concert tours